Halfway Between the Gutter and the Stars is the third studio album by English electronic music producer Fatboy Slim. It was first released on 6 November 2000 in the United Kingdom by Skint Records and a day later in the United States by Astralwerks. The album features contributions from Macy Gray, Ashley Slater, Bootsy Collins, Roland Clark, and Roger Sanchez, and its title, referenced in the song "Weapon of Choice", is an allusion to the Oscar Wilde quote, "We are all in the gutter, but some of us are looking at the stars."

Critical reception

Halfway Between the Gutter and the Stars received generally positive reviews from critics. Robert Christgau of The Village Voice wrote "this is where Norman Cook achieves the nonstop stupidity breakbeats alone could never bring him", calling it "All shallow, all pure as a result—pure escape, pure delight, and, as the cavalcade of gospel postures at the end makes clear, pure spiritual yearning. Transcendence, we all want it." The A.V. Club called it "a big load of disposable fun and funk that's fluffier than cotton candy and just as weighty."

On the other hand, Pitchfork wrote, "After enjoying a few years of relative popularity, it seems big-beat's appeal and relevance are waning. [...] After listening to Slim's latest, Halfway Between the Gutter and the Stars, it seems we've reached come-down time. And surprise! It's no fun at all", though "the problem lies more with the everchanging landscape of electronic music and the dying big-beat genre than it does with his technical skill." Entertainment Weekly called it "Melodically repetitive, the songs only intermittently approach the energizing highs of earlier Fatboy cuts." Spin called it a "post-masterpiece puzzler where the kicks just keep getting harder to find, spread-eagle between pop limitations and artistic aspirations."

Tim O'Neil of PopMatters later said the album was "extremely underrated."

Track listing

Note
On the iTunes release, "Talking 'bout My Baby (Reprise)" is separated from "Song for Shelter", making the track times 9:00 and 2:26 respectively.

Sample credits
 "Talking Bout My Baby" contains samples of "Macon Hambone Blues", written by Jack Hall, Jimmy Hall, John Anthony, Richard Hirsch, Lewis Ross, and Leslie Bricusse, and performed by Wet Willie.
 "Star 69" and "Song for Shelter" contain samples of "I Get Deep", written and performed by Roland Clark.
 "Sunset (Bird of Prey)" contains samples of "Bird of Prey", written and performed by Jim Morrison.
 "Ya Mama" contains samples of "The Kettle", written by Jon Hiseman and Dick Heckstall-Smith, and performed by Colosseum, "Shake Whatcha Mama Gave Ya", written by Frankie Cutlass and performed by Stik-E and the Hoods, and "Let the Rhythm Pump", written and performed by Doug Lazy.
 "Drop the Hate" contains samples of "Answer to Watergate", performed by the Reverend W. Leo Daniels.
 "Demons" contains samples of "I Can't Write Left Handed", written by Bill Withers and Ray Jackson, and performed by Bill Withers.

Edited version

An edited version also exists, which removes "Star 69" (due to the song's recurring use of the word "fuck", which is the sole reason for obtaining a Parental Advisory label), and removes the song's reprise used in "Song for Shelter".. The artwork is also cropped to cut off right before the leg gap, (presumably for the subject likely being nude) and has a mark saying "Kiddies' Clean Version", similar in design to the Parental Advisory label on normal copies.

Charts

Weekly charts

Year-end charts

Certifications

References

External links
 

2000 albums
Fatboy Slim albums
Skint Records albums